Hyperoptica ptilocentra is a moth in the family Xyloryctidae, and the only species in the genus Hyperoptica. The genus and species were both described by Edward Meyrick in 1934 and are found in China.

References

Xyloryctidae
Xyloryctidae genera
Monotypic moth genera
Taxa named by Edward Meyrick